Ryuya Okuwaki (born 26 August 2000), also known as Ryuya Eiwasportsgym in Thailand, is a Japanese Muay Thai fighter. He is the former Rajadamnern, WPMF and IBF Muaythai World mini flyweight champion. 

He is the former WMC World Pinweight champion.

Muay Thai fighter
Okuwaki made his professional debut against Hanuman Sor. Walitar in June 2016, winning the fight by unanimous decision. He would win four of his next six fights, with his 7-2 record earning him a chance to fight Newjorwan Pumpanmuang for the WMC World Pinweight title. Okuwaki defeated Newjorwan by unanimous decision.

Okuwaki lost his next fight against Phetdeet Wor. Sanprapai by decision, but would rebounded with a two fight win streak. In April 2019, he fought a rematch with Newjorwan Pumpanmuang, for the Muay Siam Isan 105lbs title. Okuwaki once again defeated Newjorwan, this time with a second round head kick knockout. Two months later, Okuwaki fought Phetdeet Wor. Sanprapai for the WBC Muaythai 105lbs title, losing the fight by unanimous decision.

In September 2019, Okuwaki was scheduled to fight Mungkornyok AnnyMuayThai for the Rajadamnern Stadium 105lbs title. He defeated Mungkornyok by unanimous decision.

Okuwaki fought Phetsila MTM Academy for the WPMF World Mini Flyweight title at BOM 2-6. He lost the fight by majority decision. He was once again scheduled to fight for the fight same title two months later, against Udonnoi Bestbet 9955. Okuwaki won the fight by a fourth round knockout.

Yoshinari faced Ryuto Oinuma at Rizin 31 - Yokohama on October 24, 2021. He won the bout via majority decision.

Championships and accomplishments

Amateur
 2015 Suk Wan Kingtong Real Champion Tournament -42kg Winner
 2015 WBC Muay Thai Jr. League All Japan -40kg Champion
 2015 SMASHERS -40 kg Champion
 2015 Bigbang Amateur -37 kg
 2014 All Japan SMASHERS Tournament -40kg Winner
 2014 MA Kick Jr -32kg Champion
 2013 NJKF Junior Kick -30kg
 2012 MA Kick Jr -28kg Champion
 2011 MA Kick Jr -25kg Champion
 2010 NJKF Junior Kick -25kg Champion

Professional
World Professional Muaythai Federation
 2020 WPMF World Mini Flyweight Champion

Rajadamnern Stadium
 2019 Rajadamnern Stadium 105 lbs Champion

International Boxing Federation Muaythai
 2019 IBF Muay Thai Mini-Flyweight Champion

Muay Siam
 2019 Muay Siam Isan 105 lbs Champion

World Muay Thai Council
 2018 WMC World Pinweight Champion

Awards
eFight.jp
Fighter of the Month (September 2019)

Fight record

|-  style="background:#;"
| 2023-04-09 || || align=left| Sunday Boomdeksian  || BOM Ouroboros 2023 || Tokyo, Japan ||   || ||
|-  style="background:#cfc;"
| 2022-12-11 || Win || align=left| Newang KofightThailand|| BOM 37 || Yokohama, Japan || KO (Low kicks) || 1 || 0:42
|-  style="text-align:center; background:#cfc"
| 2021-12-12|| Win ||align=left| Yuzuki Sakai || RISE 153 || Tokyo, Japan ||Decision (Unanimous) || 3 ||3:00
|-  style="text-align:center; background:#cfc;"
| 2021-11-14|| Win ||align=left| Koichi Sakamoto || Super Bigbang 2021 || Yokohama, Japan || KO (Flying Knee) || 1 || 2:14
|-  style="background:#cfc;"
| 2021-10-24|| Win || align=left| Ryuto Oinuma || Rizin 31 - Yokohama || Yokohama, Japan || Decision (Majority)|| 3 || 3:00
|-  style="text-align:center; background:#cfc;"
| 2021-09-26|| Win || align=left| Tomo ||  BOM – ouroboros 2021 – || Tokyo, Japan || Decision (Unanimous) || 3 ||3:00
|-  style="text-align:center; background:#c5d2ea;"
| 2021-07-28|| Draw ||align=left| Riku Kazushima || RISE 151 || Tokyo, Japan ||  Decision (Majority)|| 3 ||3:00
|-  style="text-align:center; background:#cfc;"
| 2021-04-11|| Win ||align=left| Masa Bravely|| BOM WAVE 04 – Get Over The COVID-19  || Yokohama, Japan || Decision (Unanimous) || 5 || 3:00
|-  style="text-align:center; background:#cfc;"
| 2021-02-28|| Win ||align=left| Shinichi Watanabe || RISE Eldorado 2021 || Yokohama, Japan || Decision (Unanimous)|| 3||3:00
|-  style="text-align:center; background:#cfc;"
| 2020-12-06|| Win ||align=left| Hidetora Abe || The Battle Of Muay Thai WAVE 03 - Get over the COVID-19 || Yokohama, Japan || TKO || 1||1:40
|-  style="text-align:center; background:#cfc;"
| 2020-10-04|| Win ||align=left| Ryunosuke Wor.Wanchai || The Battle Of Muay Thai Wave 02 Get over the COVID-19 || Yokohama, Japan || Decision (Unanimous) || 5 || 3:00
|-  style="text-align:center; background:#cfc;"
| 2020-02-09||Win||align=left| Udonnoi Bestbet 9955 || The Battle Of Muay Thai SEASON II vol.7 || Tokyo, Japan ||KO (Right Hook)  || 4 || 0:57
|-
! style=background:white colspan=9 |
|-  style="text-align:center; background:#FFBBBB;"
| 2019-12-08||Loss||align=left| Petchsila MTM Academy || BOM 2-6～THE Battle Of Muaythai SEASON II vol.6 || Tokyo, Japan || Decision (Majority) || 5 || 3:00
|-
! style=background:white colspan=9 |
|-  style="text-align:center; background:#cfc;"
| 2019-10-31 || Win ||align=left| SangArthit Sidchefboontham  || Rajadamnern Stadium "Chujaroen Muay Thai"  || Bangkok, Thailand || Decision || 5 || 3:00
|-  style="text-align:center; background:#CCFFCC;"
| 2019-09-09|| Win ||align=left| Mungkornyok AnnyMuayThai ||  Rajadamnern Stadium || Bangkok, Thailand || Decision (Unanimous)|| 5 || 3:00
|-
! style=background:white colspan=9 |
|-  style="text-align:center; background:#CCFFCC;"
| 2019-07-18|| Win ||align=left| Boonlai Sidchefboontham ||  Rajadamnern Stadium || Bangkok, Thailand || Decision || 5 || 3:00
|-
! style=background:white colspan=9 |
|-  style="text-align:center; background:#FFBBBB;"
| 2019-06-01|| Loss||align=left| Phetdeet Wor. Sanprapai ||  BOM -The Battle Of Muay Thai- season II vol.2 || Yokohama, Japan || Decision (Unanimous)|| 5 || 3:00
|-
! style=background:white colspan=9 |
|-  style="text-align:center; background:#CCFFCC;"
| 2019-04-14|| Win ||align=left| Newjorwan Pumpanmuang ||  BOM2-1 - The Battle Of Muay Thai Season II vol.1 - || Yokohama, Japan || KO (Left High Kick)|| 2 || 1:45
|-
! style=background:white colspan=9 |
|-  style="text-align:center; background:#CCFFCC;"
| 2019-03-16|| Win ||align=left|  ||  Omnoi Boxing Stadium || Samut Sakhon, Thailand ||Decision (Unanimous) || 5  || 3:00
|-  style="text-align:center; background:#CCFFCC;"
| 2018-12-09|| Win ||align=left| Joker Phetsimean ||  The Battle Of Muaythai 20 || Yokohama, Japan ||Decision (Unanimous) || 5  || 3:00
|-  style="text-align:center; background:#FFBBBB;"
| 2018-08-29|| Loss||align=left|  Phetdeet Wor. Sanprapai || Suk Wan Kinthong Muay Thai Super Fight || Tokyo, Japan ||Decision  || 5  || 3:00
|-  style="text-align:center; background:#CCFFCC;"
| 2018-04-08|| Win ||align=left| Newjorwan Pumpanmuang ||  Battle Of Muaythai 17 || Yokohama, Japan || Decision (Unanimous)|| 5 || 3:00
|-
! style=background:white colspan=9 |
|-  style="text-align:center; background:#CCFFCC;"
| 2017-11-29|| Win ||align=left|  ||   ||  Thailand || Decision || 5 || 3:00
|-  style="text-align:center; background:#fbb;"
| 2017-08-28|| Loss||align=left| Chokpreecha Fukenoodle ||  Rajadamnern Stadium ||  Bangkok, Thailand || Decision || 5 || 3:00
|-  style="text-align:center; background:#CCFFCC;"
| 2017-07-26|| Win ||align=left| Chokpreecha Fukenoodle ||  Rajadamnern Stadium ||  Bangkok, Thailand || Decision || 5 || 3:00
|-  style="text-align:center; background:#CCFFCC;"
| 2017-05-13|| Win ||align=left|  ||  Rajadamnern Stadium ||  Bangkok, Thailand || KO || 3 ||
|-  style="text-align:center; background:#CCFFCC;"
| 2017-03-25|| Win ||align=left|  ||  Rajadamnern Stadium ||  Bangkok, Thailand || Decision || 5 || 3:00
|-  style="text-align:center; background:#FFBBBB;"
| 2016-10-09|| Loss||align=left| Sonlam 13LianResort ||  Suk Wanchai MuayThai Super Fight || Tokyo, Japan || Decision (Unanimous)|| 3 || 3:00
|-  style="text-align:center; background:#CCFFCC;"
| 2016-06-19|| Win ||align=left| Hanuman Sor. Walitar ||  Wanchai+Kingthong MuayThai Super Fight || Tokyo, Japan || Decision (Unanimous)|| 3 || 3:00
|-
| colspan=9 | Legend:    

|-  style="background:#fbb;"
| 2016-02-21|| Loss ||align=left| Asahi Shinagawa || Bigbang Amateur 32 || Tokyo, Japan || Decision || 3 || 1:30  
|-
! style=background:white colspan=9 |
|-  style="background:#cfc;"
| 2016-02-07|| Win || align=left| Ayato Kosaka || NJKF EXPLOSION 4|| Tokyo, Japan || Decision ||2 || 1:30
|-  style="background:#cfc;"
| 2015-12-20|| Win || align=left| Asahi Shinagawa|| Suk Wan Kingthong, Real Champion Tournament 42kg Final || Tokyo, Japan || Decision || ||
|-  style="background:#cfc;"
| 2015-12-20|| Win || align=left| Yushin Noguchi|| Suk Wan Kingthong, Real Champion Tournament 42kg Semi Final || Tokyo, Japan || Decision || ||
|-  style="background:#cfc;"
| 2015-12-12 || Win ||align=left| Yuuta Kitamura || JAKF AUTHORIZATION SMASHERS Champion's Carnival 2015|| Tokyo, Japan || Decision || 2 || 2:00
|-  style="background:#cfc;"
| 2015-11-29 || Win ||align=left| Sho MAX || TENKAICHI 78|| Okinawa, Japan || KO || 2 ||
|-  style="background:#cfc;"
| 2015-08-30|| Win || align=left| Kanta Motoyama || 1st WBC Muay Thai Jr League, All Japan Tournament Final|| Tokyo, Japan || Decision || ||
|-
! style=background:white colspan=9 |
|-  style="background:#cfc;"
| 2015-08-30|| Win || align=left| Naoki Ōmura || 1st WBC Muay Thai Jr League, All Japan Tournament Semi Final|| Tokyo, Japan || Decision || ||
|-  style="background:#cfc;"
| 2015-07-05|| Win|| align=left| Naoki Ōmura || NJKF EXPLOSION  || Tokyo, Japan || Decision ||2 ||1:30
|-  style="background:#cfc;"
| 2015-06-14 || Win ||align=left| Suki Sugita || JAKF SMASHERS|| Tokyo, Japan || KO || 1 ||
|-
! style=background:white colspan=9 |
|-  style="background:#cfc;"
| 2015-06-07|| Win ||align=left| Shogo Nakano || Bigbang Amateur 29|| Tokyo, Japan || ||  ||
|-  style="background:#cfc;"
| 2015-04-29 || Win ||align=left| Shinnosuke Yamada || NJKF EXPLOSION 1|| Tokyo, Japan || Decision || 2 || 1:30
|-  style="background:#cfc;"
| 2015-03-22 || Win ||align=left| Yu Hiramatsu || JAKF SMASHERS 170|| Tokyo, Japan || Decision || 2 ||1:30
|-
! style=background:white colspan=9 |
|-  style="background:#fbb;"
| 2015-03-08|| Loss ||align=left| Nadaka Yoshinari || MA Nihon Kick TRADITION 2～STAIRWAY TO DREAM|| Tokyo, Japan || Decision  || 3 || 2:00 
|-
! style=background:white colspan=9 |
|-  style="background:#cfc;"
| 2015-02-15 || Win ||align=left| Iori Maeda || Bigbang Amateur 26|| Tokyo, Japan || KO || 1 ||
|-
! style=background:white colspan=9 |
|-  style="background:#fbb;"
| 2014-12-23 || Loss||align=left| Jukiya Ito  || Amateur REBELS BLOW-CUP.34, Final|| Tokyo, Japan ||Decision (Split)  ||  ||
|-  style="background:#cfc;"
| 2014-12-23 || Win ||align=left| Yudai Kitamura  || Amateur REBELS BLOW-CUP.34, Semi Final|| Tokyo, Japan ||Decision (Unanimous)  ||  ||
|-  style="background:#cfc;"
| 2014-12-13 || Win ||align=left| Shinnosuke Yamada || INNOVATION SMASHERS Tournament, Final || Tokyo, Japan ||  ||  ||
|-  style="background:#cfc;"
| 2014-12-13 || Win ||align=left| || INNOVATION SMASHERS Tournament, Semi Final || Tokyo, Japan ||  ||  ||
|-  style="background:#cfc;"
| 2014-12-13 || Win ||align=left| || INNOVATION SMASHERS Tournament, Quarter Final || Tokyo, Japan ||  ||  ||
|-  style="background:#cfc;"
| 2014-09-21 || Win ||align=left| Shogo Nakajima || JAKF SMASHERS 167 || Tokyo, Japan || Decision (Unanimous)|| 2 || 1:30
|- style="background:#cfc;"
| 2014-09-07|| Win|| align="left" | Shota Torigoe || Bigbang Amateur 23 ||Tokyo, Japan|| KO (Knees)||  ||
|- style="background:#fbb;"
| 2014-06-29||Loss|| align="left" | Nadaka Yoshinari ||Muay Thai WINDY Super Fight vol.16, Final ||Tokyo, Japan|| Decision (Unanimous) || 5 || 1:00 
|-
! style=background:white colspan=9 |
|- style="background:#cfc;"
| 2014-06-29||Win|| align="left" | Shogo Nakajima ||Muay Thai WINDY Super Fight vol.16, Semi Final ||Tokyo, Japan||Decision ||  ||
|- style="background:#cfc;"
| 2014-06-29||Win|| align="left" | Asahi Shinagawa ||Muay Thai WINDY Super Fight vol.16, Quarter Final ||Tokyo, Japan|| ||  ||
|- style="background:#cfc;"
| 2014-06-29||Win|| align="left" | Yuki Ide ||Muay Thai WINDY Super Fight vol.16, First Round||Tokyo, Japan|| ||  ||
|-  style="background:#cfc;"
| 2014-04-13 || Win ||align=left| Kippei Niina || MA Nihon Kick DRAGON.5 ～THE ONE AND ONLY～ || Kanagawa, Japan || Decision (Unanimous) || 3 || 2:00
|-
! style=background:white colspan=9 |
|-  style="background:#cfc;"
| 2014-03-16 || Win ||align=left| Shimizu Hori || REBELS.25 || Tokyo, Japan || Decision || 3 || 2:00
|-  style="background:#cfc;"
| 2014-02-23|| Win ||align=left| Taison Suzuki || Bigbang Amateur 19 || Tokyo, Japan ||  Decision ||  ||
|-  style="background:#cfc;"
| 2014-01-12 || Win ||align=left| Yushin Noguchi || Muay Thai WINDY Super Fight - Muaythaiphoon || Nagoya, Japan || Decision || 2 || 2:00
|-  style="background:#FFBBBB;"
| 2013-12-01 || Loss ||align=left| Asahi Shinagawa || Battle of Muay Thai || Yokohama, Japan || Decision || 2 || 2:00
|-  style="background:#c5d2ea;"
| 2013-07-14 || Draw||align=left| Asahi Shinagawa || Bigbang Amateur 15 || Tokyo, Japan || Decision || 2 || 1:30
|-  style="background:#c5d2ea;"
| 2013-07-14 || Draw||align=left| Issei Koizumi || Bigbang Amateur 15 || Tokyo, Japan || Decision || 2 || 1:30
|-  style="background:#cfc;"
| 2013-06-30 || Win ||align=left| Tōma Sugihara || Muay Thai Open 23|| Tokyo, Japan || Decision (Unanimous)|| 3 || 2:00
|-  style="background:#cfc;"
| 2013-04-21 || Win ||align=left| Tōma Sugihara || NJKF Muay Thai-Samklen 2 || Tokyo, Japan || Decision || 2 || 3:00
|-
! style=background:white colspan=9 |
|-  style="background:#fbb;"
| 2013-03-03 || Loss ||align=left| Ikko Ōta || Muay Thai WINDY Super Fight vol.13|| Yokohama, Japan || Decision || 5 || 1:30 
|-
! style=background:white colspan=9 |
|-  style="background:#fbb;"
| 2013-02-24 || Loss ||align=left| Ikko Ōta || Muay Thai open 23|| Tokyo, Japan || Decision ||  || 
|-
! style=background:white colspan=9 |
|-  style="background:#FFBBBB;"
| 2012-08-26|| Loss||align=left| Toki Tamaru || MA Japan Kickboxing Break 28 || Tokyo, Japan ||  Decision || 3 || 1:30
|-
! style=background:white colspan=9 |
|-  style="background:#FFBBBB;"
| 2012-08-05 || Loss ||align=left| Haruto Yasumoto || Muay Yoko 19 || Tokyo, Japan || Decision || 2 || 2:00
|-  style="background:#cfc;"
| 2012-06-24 || Win||align=left| Nadaka Yoshinari || Muay Yoko 18 || Ōta, Tokyo, Japan || Ex.R Decision || 3 || 1:30
|-  style="background:#cfc;"
| 2012-06-24 || Win||align=left| Nobutaka Honda || Muay Yoko 18 || Ōta, Tokyo, Japan || Decision || 2 || 1:30
|-  style="background:#cfc;"
| 2012-05-06 || Win||align=left| Asahi Saitō || MA Japan Kick BREAK-25 - CANNONBALL || Tokyo, Japan || Decision || 2 || 1:30
|-
! style=background:white colspan=9 |
|-  style="background:#FFBBBB;"
| 2012-04-15 || Loss ||align=left| Ikkō Ōta || Bigbang Amateur 5 || Tokyo, Japan || Decision || 2 || 1:30
|-  style="background:#cfc;"
| 2011-08-07 || Win||align=left| Nadaka Yoshinari || Muay Yoko 16 || Yokohama, Japan || Ex.R Decision || 3 || 1:30
|-  style="background:#cfc;"
| 2011-07-18 || Win||align=left| Kyōsuke Higashihara || MA Japan Kick BREAK-16 - GRASP || Tokyo, Japan || Decision (Split) || 3 || 1:30
|-
! style=background:white colspan=9 |
|-  style="background:#cfc;"
| 2011-07-03 || Win||align=left| Kanta Emori || Muay Thai WINDY Super Fight in NAGOYA ～Muay Tyhoon!～|| Nagoya, Japan || Decision  ||  ||
|-  style="background:#FFBBBB;"
| 2011-06-05 || Loss ||align=left| Naito Harada || Muay Yoko 15, Final|| Nagoya, Japan || Decision  || 3 || 2:00
|-  style="background:#FFBBBB;"
| 2011-04-29 || Loss||align=left| Takito Tamaru || Muay Thai WINDY Super Fight vol.6, Final || Tokyo, Japan || Decision  || 1 || 2:00 
|-
! style=background:white colspan=9 |
|-  style="background:#cfc;"
| 2011-04-29 || Win||align=left| Kanta Emori || Muay Thai WINDY Super Fight vol.6, Semi Final || Tokyo, Japan || Decision  || 1|| 2:00
|-  style="background:#cfc;"
| 2011-04-29 || Win||align=left| Ryoga Matsudo || Muay Thai WINDY Super Fight vol.6, Quarter Final || Tokyo, Japan || Decision  || 1 || 2:00
|-  style="background:#cfc;"
| 2011-04-24 || Win||align=left| Kanta Emori || MA Japan Kick BREAK-12 -It starts- || Tokyo, Japan || Decision  || 3 || 1:30 
|-
! style=background:white colspan=9 |
|-  style="background:#cfc;"
| 2011-04-17 || Win||align=left| Kyōsuke Higashihara ||MA kick Amateur 135 || Tokyo, Japan || Ex.R Decision (Split)  || 4 || 1:30 
|-
| colspan=9 | Legend:

See also
 List of male kickboxers

References

External links
 

2000 births
Living people
Japanese male kickboxers
Sportspeople from Kanagawa Prefecture